Haradinaj is an Albanian surname, derived from Arabic Khair ad-Din meaning "the goodness of the Faith". It may refer to:

Ramush Haradinaj (born 1968), Kosovar politician
Daut Haradinaj (born 1978), Kosovar Albanian politician

See also
Hajradinović, Bosnian variant

Albanian-language surnames